Waterloo Halt railway station was a small halt which served the community of Rudry in Caerphilly, South Wales between 1908 and 1956.

Like other halts on the line, Waterloo was very basic, consisting of a single ground-level platform made from sleepers, a name-board and one lamp (though the halt did have a second lamp for at least some of its later life). There was no shelter, with passengers being confined to a fenced enclosure, whose gate to the platform would be unlocked by the guard when the train arrived.

Located on the original Brecon & Merthyr Loop Line (as opposed to the second line which was built later by the Pontypridd, Newport & Caerphilly Railway), Waterloo Halt was served by 'down' services only. Fountain Bridge Halt on the opposite side of the river (on the PN&CR line) was served by the 'up' trains.

The halt closed in 1956 when the passenger service was withdrawn. The site is now the garden of a private residence.

References

Disused railway stations in Caerphilly County Borough
Former Brecon and Merthyr Tydfil Junction Railway stations
Railway stations in Great Britain opened in 1908
Railway stations in Great Britain closed in 1956
1908 establishments in Wales
1956 disestablishments in Wales